State Route 120 (SR 120) is a  state highway that runs west-to-east through portions of Haralson, Paulding, Cobb, Fulton, and Gwinnett counties in northwestern part of the U.S. state of Georgia.

Route description

SR 120 begins at an intersection with SR 100 (Bowdon Street) in Tallapoosa, in Haralson County. It heads northeast into Buchanan. Here, it first intersects US 27 Business/SR 1 Business. Then, it meets US 27/SR 1. Just before leaving the county, it enters Draketown, where it intersects SR 113 (Buchanan Highway). The two routes run concurrent to the northeast. In Paulding County, it enters Union. There, they intersect SR 101. At this intersection, SR 113 departs to the north. About  later, it intersects SR 120 Connector (Scoggins Road). Nearly  later, SR 120 enters Dallas. Almost immediately, it meets US 278/SR 6 (Jimmy Campbell Parkway). At this intersection, SR 6 Business (Buchanan Street) east begins and heads northeastward. US 278/SR 6/SR 120 head concurrently to the southeast. At the east end of town is SR 61 (Nathan Dean Boulevard). Farther to the east, in Hiram, the concurrency intersects SR 360 and Bill Carruth Parkway. At this intersection, SR 120/SR 360 head northward on Charles Hardy Parkway. Just over  later, they meet SR 6 Business (Atlanta Highway). At Macland Road, SR 360 splits off to the southeast, while SR 120 continues to the northeast. A short distance later, it intersects SR 92 (Hiram Acworth Highway). Approximately  later, the road enters Cobb County. Just before entering Marietta, the highway passes through Kennesaw Mountain National Battlefield Park. In the central part of the city, it intersects SR 5 and the western terminus of SR 120 Alternate (North Marietta Parkway NW). At this intersection, SR 5/SR 120 head to the southeast. About  later, they intersect SR 360 (Powder Springs Street). Only a short distance later, the two routes split. To the southeast is Southern Polytechnic State University and then US 41/SR 3 (Cobb Parkway SE). A short distance later is an interchange with Interstate 75 (I-75). To the northeast, the highway meets the eastern terminus of both SR 3 Connector (Roswell Road) and SR 120 Alternate (North Marietta Parkway NE). It crosses over the Willeo Creek into Fulton County. In Roswell, it intersects SR 9 (South Atlanta Street), where they begin a concurrency to the northeast. In the central part of the city, they intersect the eastern terminus of SR 92 (East Crossville Road) and SR 140 (Holcomb Bridge Road). For about a block, SR 140 joins the concurrency, until it departs to the northwest on Houze Road. SR 9/SR 120 pass the North Fulton Hospital, just before entering Alpharetta. In the central part of the city, SR 9 departs to the north on South Main Street, while SR 120 heads eastward on Old Milton Parkway. Farther to the east is an interchange with US 19/SR 400 (Turner McDonald Parkway). In Johns Creek, it meets SR 141 (Medlock Bridge Road). The road crosses over the Chattahoochee River over the Abbotts Bridge and enters Gwinnett County and the Chattahoochee River National Recreation Area. In Duluth is an intersection with US 23/SR 13 (Buford Highway). The route continues to the southeast, until just before it meets I-85. Just before entering Lawrenceville, it meets the southern terminus of SR 317 (Lawrenceville Suwannee Road). Slightly to the southeast, is an interchange SR 316 (University Parkway). The city limits pass within the interchange. SR 120 continues to the southeast until it meets its eastern terminus, an intersection with US 29/SR 8, in the central part of the city.

SR 120 has two sections that are included as part of the National Highway System, a system of roadways important to the nation's economy, defense, and mobility. They are:
 From the western end of the concurrency with US 278/SR 6 in Dallas, then northeast into Marietta, to the eastern end of the concurrency with SR 5
 From the intersection with Sewell Mill Road NE, just northeast of Marietta, to its eastern terminus

History

From 1969 to 2007, SR 120 Loop looped around Marietta. In October 2007, SR 120 Loop was decommissioned, and mainline SR 120 was rerouted to the southern part of the loop. Prior to October 2007, mainline SR 120 ran through downtown Marietta and formed the southern part of Marietta Square. The portion of SR 120 from U.S. 41/SR 3 to SR 120 Alternate was renumbered SR 3 Connector. This was done at the same time changes were made to SR 5.

Major intersections

Special routes

Dallas–Hiram connector route

State Route 120 Connector (SR 120 Conn.) exists within the south-central and southeastern parts of Paulding County.

The route begins at an intersection with the SR 120 mainline (Buchanan Highway) southwest of Dallas, Georgia. It heads east as Scoggins Road to an intersection with SR 61 (Villa Rica Highway) At this intersection, the highway takes the name Hiram Sudie Road. It continues to the east and meets the Bill Carruth Parkway, before it reaches its eastern terminus, an intersection with SR 92 (Hiram Douglasville Highway) on the southwestern edge of Hiram.

SR 120 Connector is not part of the National Highway System, a system of roadways important to the nation's economy, defense, and mobility.

Lost Mountain–New Hope connector route

State Route 120 Connector (SR 120 Conn.) was a connector route of SR 120 in Paulding County. The highway that would eventually become SR 120 Conn. was established at the end of 1940 as SR 176 from SR 6 in Hiram to SR 92 in New Hope. A portion of SR 176 just west of Lost Mountain had a "sand clay, top soil, or stabilized earth" surface. By the middle of 1950, a portion just west of Lost Mountain was hard surfaced. In 1953, a portion west of Lost Mountain had completed grading, but was not surfaced. By the middle of 1955, this entire segment of SR 176 had a sand clay, topsoil, or stabilized earth surface. About two years later, it was indicated to have a "topsoil or gravel, unpaved" surface. Between 1957 and 1960, it was paved. About a decade later, the segment of SR 176 between Lost Mountain and New Hope was shifted to the northeast. Its former alignment was redesignated as SR 92 Conn. In 1979, SR 92 Conn. was redesignated as SR 120 Conn. In 1983, SR 120 Conn. was decommissioned.

Marietta alternate route

State Route 120 Alternate (SR 120 Alt.) exists within the central and eastern parts of Marietta. It serves as the northern section of the Marietta Parkway.

It begins at an intersection with the SR 120 mainline (Whitlock Avenue SW) in the central part of the city. At this intersection, SR 120 Alt. is concurrent with SR 5 north of the intersection. The two highways head north and curve to the east and meet US 41/SR 3 (Cobb Parkway SE). Here, SR 5 turns north onto Cobb Parkway, while SR 120 Alt. continues to the east on Marietta Parkway. The road meets an interchange with Interstate 75 (I-75) before curving to the southeast to meet its eastern terminus, an interchange with the eastern terminus of SR 3 Conn. (Roswell Road) and the SR 120 mainline.

SR 120 Alt. is not part of the National Highway System, a system of roadways important to the nation's economy, defense, and mobility.

The road that is now SR 120 used to be the northern half of SR 120 Loop, before that designation was decommissioned.

Marietta loop route

State Route 120 Loop (SR 120 Loop) was the former designation of the entire length of the Marietta Parkway, completely within the city limits of Marietta. As its name implies, it was a loop around the center of the city.

These intersections start from the western meeting with the SR 120 mainline and proceed counterclockwise. As a loop, it did not have actual beginning or ending terminii.

See also

References

External links

 
 Georgia Roads (Routes 101-120)
 Georgia State Route 120 on State-Ends.com
 Georgia State Route 120 CONN on State-Ends.com

120
State Route 120
State Route 120
State Route 120
Transportation in Haralson County, Georgia
Transportation in Paulding County, Georgia
Transportation in Cobb County, Georgia
Transportation in Fulton County, Georgia
Transportation in Gwinnett County, Georgia